The list of ship commissionings in 1882 includes a chronological list of all ships commissioned in 1882.


References 

1882
 Ship commissionings